Tulipa humilis is a species of flowering plant in the lily family, found in Syria, Lebanon, Israel, Turkey, Iran, and the North Caucasus region of Russia. The flowers are pink with yellow centers. Its preferred habitat are rocky mountain slopes. It is known by several other names in horticulture.

Synonyms
Tulipa humilis is a very variable species in both size and the appearance of the flowers. Several different names used in horticulture refer to this species. According to Christenhusz et al., the following should be included in T. humilis:
 Tulipa aucheriana Baker – wild plants are T. humilis var. aucheriana, cultivated plants can be treated as a cultivar group, T. humilis Aucheriana Group
 Tulipa kurdica Wendelbo – T. humilis var. kurdica
 Tulipa pulchella (Regel) Baker – wild plants are T. humilis var. pulchella, cultivated plants T. humilis Pulchella Group
 Tulipa violacea Boiss. & Buhse – wild plants are T. humilis var. violacea, cultivated plants T. humilis Violacea Group

Cultivation
Under the synonym Tulipa aucheriana this plant has been given the Royal Horticultural Society's Award of Garden Merit.

References

humilis
Flora of Asia
National symbols of Kyrgyzstan
Flora of Russia
Garden plants
Plants described in 1844